Traffic Safety with Poli is a spin-off of the Robocar Poli series. As part of Hyundai Motors' global corporate social responsibility project with RoiVisual and EBS, the series was produced for educating children on the importance of traffic safety, and has aired for two seasons. The first season of the spin-off was shown as six 11-minute episodes, in each of which two segments were combined into one episode.

Series overview

Episodes

Season 1 (2011) 
This season began on December 5 (with "Don't Imitate Jaywalking!"), and ended on December 20, 2011 (with "Making a Traffic Safety Map of Our Town"). The season contains 12 episodes.

Season 2 (2013) 
Season 2 began on March 1 (with "The Secret of Street Corners"), and ended on May 31, 2013 (with "I'm the Traffic Safety Quiz Champion!"). It contains 14 episodes.

References 
 

Road safety campaigns